

Fossils
 A paper by Robert Hooke is formally published posthumously. Its contents had originally been part of an earlier presentation to the Royal Society of London. This paper provided an argument against prevailing wisdom and advocated the idea that fossils were the remains of actual once-living organisms. Still, it was not enough to change the general consensus of his contemporaries in the scientific community.
 In the second edition of an earlier book (published in 1677), Robert Plot concludes that fossils (which he referred to as "lapides sui generis") were not the remains of once-living organisms, but were stones made to look like organisms by some unknown force of nature, instituted by God to decorate the inner parts of the Earth, in the way flowers beautify its surface.

References

18th century in paleontology
Paleontology